Ofer Biham is a faculty member at The Racah Institute of Physics of the Hebrew University of Jerusalem in Israel.  Biham received his Ph.D. for research on quasiperiodic systems at the Weizmann Institute of Science in 1988, under the supervision of David Mukamel.

In later years, Biham was involved in the development of methods for the calculation of unstable periodic orbits in chaotic systems, models for efficient simulations of traffic flow and quantum computation.

The focus of Biham's current research is on the development of computational methodologies for the simulation of stochastic processes in interstellar chemistry and in genetic networks. Biham is known for the Biham–Middleton–Levine traffic model which he formulated with A. Alan Middleton and Dov Levine in 1992. It is possibly the simplest model containing phase transitions and self-organization.

His doctoral students include Daniel Lidar.

Bibliography

References

External links
Ofer Biham's homepage

Year of birth missing (living people)
Living people
Israeli physicists
Israeli Jews
Jewish physicists